Knäck or Christmas Butterscotch is a traditional Swedish toffee prepared at Christmas. The name translates into "crack" and refers to its hard consistency (reminiscent of Daim or Skor bars). Some prefer their knäck to be soft and chewy, which is easily attainable by simmering the mix for a shorter time.

Recipe
A common recipe is equal parts (typically 0.3 litres) of heavy cream (not whipped), sugar and golden syrup (or Swedish light syrup, ljus sirap). It is also common to add a few tablespoons of butter. One may also add 5 or 10 grams (1-2 tsp) of vanilla sugar or about 0.1 kg of peeled and finely chopped almonds. Put all the ingredients except for the almonds in a heavy based saucepan and let simmer until the sugar has melted, do not stir n.b. The mixture will rise and fall a few times. Simmer until a few drops of the mix poured into cold water can be rolled into a chewy or hard ball. Then add the almonds a spoonful of butter, and pour in waxed paper cups and leave to cool. Even though the recipe is easy, the process of simmering can take up to 1.5 hours.

If using a thermometer to supervise the process, a minimum final temperature is around 125 degrees C for a fairly soft product, when it gets to 130 degrees or more the final result is very hard.

References

Toffee
Swedish confectionery
Christmas food
Christmas in Sweden